Ramnagar is a village of Feni District in the Chittagong Division of Bangladesh. It is located at 22°56'0N 91°17'0E with an altitude of 4 metres (16 feet).

References

Populated places in Feni District